The 2013 Wellington Sevens was the 14th edition of the tournament as part of the 2012–13 IRB Sevens World Series. It was hosted in Wellington, New Zealand, at the Westpac Stadium.

England defeated Kenya 24–19 in the final to win the title.

Format
The teams were divided into pools of four teams, who played a round-robin within the pool. Points were awarded in each pool on a different schedule from most rugby tournaments—3 for a win, 2 for a draw, 1 for a loss.
The top two teams in each pool advanced to the Cup competition. The four quarterfinal losers dropped into the bracket for the Plate. The Bowl was contested by the third- and fourth-place finishers in each pool, with the losers in the Bowl quarterfinals dropping into the bracket for the Shield.

Teams
The participating teams were:

Pool stage
The draw was made on December 9, 2012.

Pool A

Pool B

Pool C

Pool D

Knockout stage

Shield

Bowl

Plate

Cup

References

External links

Wellington Sevens
Wellington Sevenst
2013